Charity Basaza Mulenga is a Ugandan electrical engineer and academic administrator. She was the founding vice chancellor (2011 to 2016) of St. Augustine International University (SAIU), a private institution of higher education that the Uganda National Council for Higher Education accredited in 2011.

Background and education
She was born circa 1979 in Kisoro District in the Western Region of Uganda.

Mulenga studied electrical engineering at Makerere University, the largest and oldest public university in Uganda, graduating with a Bachelor of Science degree in 2001. Her Master of Science degree in digital communication systems was awarded by the University of Loughborough in 2004. She also holds a Doctor of Philosophy degree in electrical and electronic engineering, awarded in 2010 by Loughborough University.

Work experience
In 2001 Mulenga joined MTN Uganda as a switch planning engineer. In 2003, she left there to pursue a Master of Science degree in the United Kingdom on a British Council scholarship. She returned to Uganda in 2005 and joined the Faculty of Computing and Information Technology at Makerere University as a research coordinator. While there, she obtained another scholarship to pursue her doctorate. Her research area was antennas and electromagnetic modelling. During this period, she was appointed an assistant lecturer in the same faculty at Makerere. In 2009, she was appointed deputy vice chancellor at SAIU. Between 2011 and 2016, she served as vice chancellor at SAIU. She is a member of the University Council at SAIU.

See also
 List of universities in Uganda

References

External links
  "The Application of Periodic Structures to Conical Antenna Design": PhD Thesis By Charity Basaza Mulenga at Loughborough University In 2009
 Makerere University, School of Computing and Informatics Technology: List of Supervisors for The Graduate Programme In The Academic Year 2010/2011 
 Omweso Computer Game - Thesis In Partial Fulfillment of the Degree of Bachelor of Science In Computer Science at Makerere University Kampala: Lead Developer: Abdul Semakula; Supervisor: Charity Basaza Mulenga. Date: June 2006

Living people
1979 births
Alumni of Loughborough University
Makerere University alumni
People from Kisoro District
People from Western Region, Uganda
Ugandan Christians
Vice-chancellors of universities in Uganda
Ugandan electrical engineers
Electrical engineering academics
Ugandan women engineers
Ugandan women academics
Academic staff of Makerere University
21st-century women engineers
Academic staff of King Ceasor University